Tehran International Airport can refer to either of the following airports:

Tehran Imam Khomeini International Airport, the city's main international airport
Tehran Mehrabad International Airport, the city's secondary airport, used primarily for domestic flights